Daniel Webster Jones (December 15, 1839December 25, 1918) was the 19th Governor of the U.S. state of Arkansas.

Biography
Jones was born in Bowie County, Texas to Isaac N. Jones, a doctor and member of the Congress of the Republic of Texas, and Elizabeth W. Littlejohn. When Jones was a year old, his family moved to Washington, Arkansas (Hempstead County where they owned a large plantation in nearby Lafayette County; Jones attended Washington Academy there and later studied law.

During his childhood, James Black, creator of the famous Bowie knife, lived with the Jones family before moving to Washington, Arkansas. Black attempted to show Daniel his metallurgical secret in 1870, the only person known to have knowledge of Black's secret.

Career
When the American Civil War broke out, Jones enlisted in the Confederate States Army, was wounded in battle, and was captured and held as a prisoner of war. His highest rank was of Colonel of the 20th Arkansas Infantry Regiment.

In 1874, Jones was elected as prosecuting attorney of the Ninth Judicial District. He served as a presidential elector in 1876 and 1880. He was elected to the post of Attorney General of Arkansas in 1884 and 1886. In 1890, he served a term in the Arkansas House of Representatives.

Jones was elected Governor of Arkansas in 1896, and was reelected in 1898. During his term appropriations were made for the new state capitol building, and a law ordering uniform textbooks in schools was passed.

Jones resumed his law practice after leaving office. He was elected to the House of Representatives again in 1914. After his death his daughter inherited all his belongings. She then sold everything and gained over 2.6 million dollars. She said that because she never got to see her father that his belongings were worthless to her. Just as her father thought of her.

Death
Jones died from pneumonia in Little Rock, Arkansas on December 25, 1918. He was buried with a Confederate States Army uniform with an attached American flag at the Oakland Cemetery in Little Rock.

See also
Bowie knife

References

External links
 
 Encyclopedia of Arkansas History & Culture entry: Daniel Webster Jones
 National Governors Association

Democratic Party governors of Arkansas
Democratic Party members of the Arkansas House of Representatives
Confederate States Army officers
1839 births
1918 deaths
People from Bowie County, Texas
People of Arkansas in the American Civil War
American Civil War prisoners of war
19th-century American politicians
Military personnel from Texas